Bursaria incana, commonly known as prickly pine, box thorn, native box, native olive and mock orange, is a species of flowering plant in the family Pittosporaceae and is endemic to northern Australia. It is a tall shrub or small, sparse tree with softly-hairy foliage, heart-shaped leaves with the narrower end towards the base, leafy groups of white flowers with five spreading sepals, five spreading petals, and flattened fruit.

Description
The five stamens are free from each other and the pistil is densely covered with matted hairs.

Taxonomy
Bursaria incana was first formally described in 1848 by John Lindley in Thomas Mitchell's Journal of an Expedition into the Interior of Tropical Australia. The specific epithet (incana) means "grey".

Distribution and habitat
This bursaria occurs throughout most of Queensland apart from near the coast and the arid inland, and in isolated populations in the northern part of the Northern Territory. It usually grows in open, grassy woodland and open forest.

References

incana
Pittosporaceae
Plants described in 1848
Flora of the Northern Territory
Flora of Queensland